Más Capaces Que Nunca is the third studio album from Duranguense band K-Paz de la Sierra.

Track listing
 Pero Te Vas a Arrepentir [a dúo con José Manuel Zamacona]
 Silueta de Cristal
 Mi Última Parranda
 El Pasadiscos
 Oh! Carol
 Un Caballero
 Quién Pompo
 He Venido a Pedirte Perdón
 El Hijo Desobediente
 Muñeca de Ojos de Miel
 Mi Credo

Chart performance

Singles

Sales and certifications

References

External links
K-Paz de la Sierra Official MySpace

K-Paz de la Sierra albums
2005 albums
Disa Records albums